List of fantasy films is a chronological listing of films in the fantasy genre. Fantasy television programs, including made for TV movies and miniseries, should be listed at List of fantasy television programs.

Fantasy films are films with fantastic themes, usually involving magic, supernatural events, incredible creatures, or exotic fantasy worlds. The genre is considered to be distinct from science fiction film and horror film, although the genres do overlap.

Films in other languages should be listed under their English titles exclusively.

 List of fantasy films before 1930
 List of fantasy films of the 1930s
 List of fantasy films of the 1940s
 List of fantasy films of the 1950s
 List of fantasy films of the 1960s
 List of fantasy films of the 1970s
 List of fantasy films of the 1980s
 List of fantasy films of the 1990s
 List of fantasy films of the 2000s
 List of fantasy films of the 2010s
 List of fantasy films of the 2020s
 List of highest-grossing fantasy films

See also 
 List of horror films
 Lists of science fiction films
 List of American superhero films

 
 
Lists of films by genre